Antonio José 'Toni' Bernal Iniesta (born 12 December 1977 in Sangonera la Verde, Region of Murcia) is a Spanish retired footballer who played as a goalkeeper.

External links

1977 births
Living people
Spanish footballers
Footballers from the Region of Murcia
Association football goalkeepers
Segunda División players
Segunda División B players
Tercera División players
Ciudad de Murcia footballers
Lorca Deportiva CF footballers
Motril CF players
Yeclano Deportivo players
Udinese Calcio players